Notable Scottish Trials was a series of books originally published by William Hodge and Company of Edinburgh, Scotland. Each volume dealt with a single case, beginning with a scholarly introduction to provide an overview of the case, followed by a verbatim account of the trial, concluding with appendices with additional material about the case. The series first appeared in 1905, with the publication of the Trial of Madeleine Smith, edited by A. Duncan Smith, at the price of five shillings (this edition was re-issued in 1927, with a new introduction by F. Tennyson Jesse).

The series of books, with their distinctive green cloth covers and gilt lettering, became so successful that Hodge began to publish a new series of trial accounts in 1911 under the series name of Notable English Trials.  These trial accounts were published in red cloth covers with gilt lettering to differentiate it from the earlier Scottish trial series. In 1921, the two series were merged into Notable British Trials and the red binding and gilt lettering became the uniform identifying feature. Between the wars cheaper editions were also sold bound in red cloth with black lettering.

References

External links 
Mango Books Imprint: Notable British Trials: Original Series

1905 non-fiction books
1905 in British law
1905 in Scotland
Scots law
Scottish case law
Scottish non-fiction literature